Naskia axiplicata is a species of sea snail, a marine gastropod mollusk in the family Horaiclavidae.

Description

Distribution
This marine species occurs on seamounts in the Naska Ridge, Southeast Pacific Ocean.

References

 Sysoev, A. V., and D. L. Ivanov. "Nex Taxa of the Family Turridae (Gastropoda, Toxoglossa) from the Naska-ridge (Southeast Pacific)." Zoologichesky Zhurnal 64.2 (1985): 194–205.

External links
  Parin, Nesis & Mironov, Biology of the Nazca and Sala y Gòmez Submarine Ridges; Advances in Marine Biology 32 (32): 145-242, December 1997
  Tucker, J.K. 2004 Catalog of recent and fossil turrids (Mollusca: Gastropoda). Zootaxa 682:1-1295.

axiplicata
Gastropods described in 1985